Jeff Hecht (born September 24, 1985) is a former Canadian football defensive back. He was originally signed as an undrafted free agent on May 26, 2011 by the Montreal Alouettes following the 2011 CFL Draft. He played CIS Football with the Saint Mary's Huskies.

Professional career

Montreal Alouettes 
Hecht was signed as an undrafted free agent on May 26, 2011 by the Montreal Alouettes following the 2011 CFL Draft. He played in all 18 games for the Alouettes, recording 31 defensive tackles and one interception. Despite a strong rookie season, he was released by the Alouettes on May 10, 2012.

Calgary Stampeders 
On June 25, 2012, he was signed by the Calgary Stampeders. He played in parts of five seasons for the Stampeders.

Saskatchewan Roughriders 
Hecht was traded to the Saskatchewan Roughriders on August 16, 2016. Following the 2016 season Hecht was not signed by the Riders and became a free agent on February 14, 2017. After about a month as a free agent Hecht re-signed with the Roughriders on March 8, 2017. He played in all 18 regular season games for the Riders in 2017, contributing 21 tackles on defense, and 11 on special teams. Hecht was released by the Riders on April 24, 2018.

Winnipeg Blue Bombers 
On July 11, 2018, it was announced that Hecht had agreed to a practice roster agreement with the Winnipeg Blue Bombers.

References

External links
Winnipeg Blue Bombers bio
Saskatchewan Roughriders bio
Calgary Stampeders bio

1985 births
Living people
Calgary Stampeders players
Canadian football defensive backs
Montreal Alouettes players
Players of Canadian football from Alberta
Saint Mary's Huskies football players
Saskatchewan Roughriders players
Canadian football people from Edmonton
Winnipeg Blue Bombers players